The 2018 South Korean Figure Skating Championships were held from January 5–7, 2018 at the Mokdong Ice Rink in Seoul. It was organized by Korea Skating Union. This was the 72nd edition of those championships held.

Skaters competed in the disciplines of men's singles, ladies' singles, ice dancing on the senior, junior levels and pair skating on the senior levels for the title of national champion of South Korea. The results of the national championships were used to choose the Korean teams to the 2018 World Junior Championships, 2018 World Championships and 2018 Winter Olympics.

Senior results

Cha Jun-hwan and You Young both won their second senior national titles.

Senior men

Senior ladies

Senior pairs

Senior ice dance

International team selections

Four Continents Championships
The 2018 Four Continents Figure Skating Championships will be held on 22–28 January 2018, in Taipei City, Chinese Taipei. Based on the results of the 2017 KSU President Cup Ranking Competition from December 1–3, 2017.

Winter Olympic Games
The 2018 Winter Olympics will be held in Pyeongchang, South Korea, February 9–25, 2018.

World Junior Championships
The 2018 World Junior Figure Skating Championships will be held in Sofia, Bulgaria, March 5–11, 2018.

World Championships
The 2018 World Figure Skating Championships will be held in Milan, Italy, March 19–25, 2018.

References

External links
 

South Korean Figure Skating Championships
South Korean Figure Skating Championships, 2017
Figure skating
January 2018 sports events in South Korea